The posse comitatus (from the Latin for "power of the county/community/guard"), frequently shortened to posse, is in common law a group of people mobilized by the conservator of peace – typically a reeve, sheriff, chief, or another special/regional designee like an officer of the peace potentially accompanied by or with the direction of a justice or ajudged parajudicial process given the imminence of actual damage – to suppress lawlessness, defend the people, or otherwise protect the place, property, and public welfare (see also ethical law enforcement (police by consent, etc.)). The posse comitatus as an English jurisprudentially defined doctrine dates back to ninth-century England and the campaigns of Alfred the Great (and before in ancient custom and law of locally martialed forces) simultaneous thereafter with the officiation of sheriff nomination to keep the regnant peace (known as "the queen/king's peace"). Justus Causus is everpresently necessary in establishing, forming, or calling up a posse and can never be the basis for the very lawlessness or subversion of order this legal maxim is intended to subdue and defend against.

Etymology
Derived from Latin, posse comitātūs ("force of the county/region") is sometimes shortened to simply posse from the mid-17th century onward to describe the force itself more than the legal principle. While the original meaning refers to a group of citizens assembled by the authorities to deal with an emergency (such as suppressing a riot or pursuing felons and outlawry), the term is also used for any force or band, especially with hostile intent, often also figuratively or humorously. In 19th-century usage, posse comitatus also acquired the generalized or figurative meaning. In classical Latin, posse is a contraction of potesse, an irregular Latin verb meaning "to be able". The unusual genitive in "-ūs" is a feature of the fourth declension. In its earliest days, the posse comitatus was subordinate to the king, country, and local authority.

United Kingdom

English Civil War
In 1642, during the early stages of the English Civil War, local forces were employed everywhere and by all sides. The powers responsible produced valid written authority, inducing the locals to assemble. The two most common authorities used were the Militia Ordinance on the side of the Parliamentarians and that of the king, the old-fashioned Commissions of Array. But the Royalist leader in Cornwall, Sir Ralph Hopton, indicted the enemy before the grand jury of the county as disturbers of the peace, and had the posse comitatus called out to expel them.

In law
The powers of sheriffs in England and Wales for posse comitatus were codified by section 8 of the Sheriffs Act 1887, the first subsection of which stated that:

This permitted the sheriff of each county to call every civilian to his assistance to catch a person who had committed a felony – that is, a serious crime. It provided for fines for those who did not comply. The provisions for posse comitatus were repealed by the Criminal Law Act 1967. The second subsection provided for the sheriff to take "the power of the county" if he faced resistance while executing a writ, and provided for the arrest of resisters. This subsection is still in force. This power can be used during the execution of a writ of seizure and sale to satisfy a debt; it allows a sheriff to call upon the police while seizing the property.

United States
The posse comitatus power continues to exist in those common-law states that have not expressly repealed it by statute. As an example, it is codified in Georgia under OCGA 17-4-24: 

In some states, especially in the Western United States, sheriffs and other law enforcement agencies have called their civilian auxiliary groups "posses". The Lattimer Massacre of 1897 illustrated the danger of such groups and thus ended their use in situations of civil unrest. Posse comitatus in the US became not an instrument of royal prerogative but an institution of local self-governance. The posse functioned through, rather than upon, the local popular will. From 1850 to 1878, the United States federal government had expanded its power over individuals.  This was done to safeguard national property rights for slaveholders, emancipate millions of enslaved African Americans, and enforce the doctrine of formal equality. The rise of the federal state, like the marketplace before it, had created contradictory but congruous forces of liberation and compulsion upon individuals.

In the early decades of the United States, before slavery became a major conflict, federal use of posse comitatus in the states was rare. But the federal posse comitatus, quite literally, had compelled all of the United States to accept the legitimacy of slavery.  In an exhaustive study of lynching in Colorado, historian Stephen Leonard defines lynching to include the people's courts and even posses, which by definition were led by sheriffs.

In the United States, a federal statute known as the Posse Comitatus Act, enacted in 1878, forbade the use of the US Army, and through it, its offspring, the US Air Force, as a posse comitatus or for law enforcement purposes without the approval of Congress. While the act does not explicitly mention the US Navy and the US Marine Corps, the US Department of the Navy has prescribed regulations that are generally construed to give the act force with respect to these branches as well. A directive in 2013 from the US Secretary of Defense directly addressed this issue and prohibited the use of the Army, Navy, Air Force and Marine Corps for domestic law enforcement. The limitation does not apply to the National Guard of the United States when activated by a state's governor and operating under Title 32 of the US Code, such as deployments by state governors in response to Hurricane Katrina.

Notable posses

Pierce County, 1856
In response to the dispatch of militia by the governor of Washington Territory, Isaac Stevens, to arrest Francis A. Chenoweth, the chief justice of the territory's supreme court, who was holding court in the Pierce County Courthouse, the sheriff of Pierce County deputized 50 to 60 civilians for the defense of the court. Negotiations ultimately resolved the standoff between the posse and the militia, and the latter withdrew.

Luzerne County, 1897
In 1897 the sheriff of Luzerne County, Pennsylvania, deputized 100 civilians to supplement 50 deputy sheriffs in confronting 400 striking mine workers at the Lattimer Mines. The posse fired at the strikers, leaving 19 dead. This incident is referred to as the Lattimer massacre.

Hinsdale County, 1994
In 1994, after violent bank robbers fled from Mineral County, Colorado, into remote Hinsdale County, Colorado, which, at the time, had two law enforcement officers for its 500 residents. The county sheriff summoned the county's power, directing more than 100 deputized civilians and 200 out-of-town police officers in house-to-house searches for the fugitives. The robbers committed suicide as the posse closed in on their location.

Legal status

Case law
Following the Baltimore riot of 1968, 1,500 lawsuits were filed against the city of Baltimore seeking compensation for damages sustained due to the failure of the police to suppress the unrest. The city sought declaratory judgment arguing that it could not be liable for any failures of the Baltimore municipal police, as it was an agency of the State of Maryland and the city had no law enforcement authority. In rejecting the argument, the Maryland Court of Appeals observed that Baltimore, as an independent city and – therefore – a county equivalent, was still in possession of the ability to summon the power of the county as that right had not explicitly been repealed by statute and, therefore, remained part of the common law. The court noted:

Statute law

State provisions
In the Journal of Criminal Law and Criminology, David Kopel observed that almost all US states provide statutory authority for sheriffs, or other local officials, to summon the county's power. In many cases, civil and criminal penalties are prescribed for members of the public who shirk posse duty when summoned; South Carolina provides that "any person refusing to assist as one of the posse ... shall be guilty of a misdemeanor and, upon conviction shall be fined not less than thirty nor more than one hundred dollars or imprisoned for thirty days" while in New Hampshire a fine of "not more than $20" has been set.

Federal provisions
Title 42, section 1989, of the United States Code extends the authority to summon the power of the county to United States magistrate judges when necessary to enforce their orders:

See also 
 Commandeering
 Conscription
 Hue and cry
 Ku Klux Klan raid (Inglewood)
 Misprision
 Vigilante

References

External links

Common law
Legal history
Latin legal terminology
History of criminal justice